The Egyptian Communist Party (ECP) is a communist party in Egypt.

History and profile
The modern Egyptian Communist Party was formed in 1975 by a number of members of the former Egyptian Communist Party. Under the regimes of Presidents Anwar Sadat and Hosni Mubarak the new Communist Party faced state repression and was barred from running in elections. The party however continued to operate underground until the overthrow of Mubarak in 2011. Despite having ECP members allegedly killed and imprisoned under Mubarak, the party have since been involved in mobilizing workers in 2011.

On 10 May 2011, the ECP agreed to enter into a "socialist front" with four other Egyptian leftist groups called the Coalition of Socialist Forces, which includes the Revolutionary Socialists, the Socialist Popular Alliance Party, Socialist Party of Egypt and the Workers Democratic Party. It also joined the National Salvation Front

See also
 Egyptian Communist Party (1921)
 Sudanese Communist Party

References

1975 establishments in Egypt
Communist parties in Egypt
Political parties established in 1975
International Meeting of Communist and Workers Parties